Cold Lake is a city in northeastern Alberta, Canada and is named after the lake nearby. Canadian Forces Base Cold Lake (CFB Cold Lake) is situated within the city's outer limits.

History 
Cold Lake was first recorded on a 1790 map, by the name of Coldwater Lake. Originally three communities, Cold Lake was formed by merging the Town of Grand Centre, the Town of Cold Lake, and Medley (Canadian Forces Base 4 Wing) on October 1, 1996. Grand Centre was renamed Cold Lake South, and the original Cold Lake is known as Cold Lake North. Because of its origins, the area is also known as the Tri-Town.

Geography 
The area surrounding the city is sparsely populated, and consists mostly of farmland.

Climate 
Cold Lake's climate is humid continental (Köppen climate classification Dfb). Summers are generally warm with cool nights, and winters are very cold with moderate snowfall.

Demographics 

About 8.7% of residents identified themselves as aboriginal at the time of the 2006 census.

Almost 89% of residents identified English and more than 7% identified French as their first language. Almost 1% identified German, 0.5% identified Chinese, 0.4% each identified Dutch and Ukrainian, and 0.3% each identified Cree and Arabic as their first language learned.

About 82 percent of residents identified as Christian at the time of the 2001 census, while more than 17 percent indicated they had no religious affiliation. For specific denominations Statistics Canada found that 40% of residents identified as Roman Catholic, 14% identified with the United Church of Canada, 5.5% identified as Anglican, 3% as Baptist, 2.5% as Lutheran, and 2% as Pentecostal.

Economy 
The city's economy is inextricably linked to military spending at CFB Cold Lake. The region also supports oil and gas exploration and production. The Athabasca Oil Sands project in Fort McMurray is having a growing influence in the region as well. The Cold Lake oil sands may become a significant contributor to the local economy.

Every year Cold Lake hosts military forces from around the world for Exercise Maple Flag, a training exercise where pilots and support staff of NATO allies can take advantage of the Air Weapons Range and relatively open rural air space. Running from 4 to 6 weeks and starting in May of each year, commercial accommodations in the entire region are left with little to no vacancy. This annual exercise contributes a substantial amount of capital into these industries and other hospitality-related businesses.

Sports 

Cold Lake has a variety of sports, including:

Hockey (Home to the Cold Lake Ice, Junior B Team) & (Home to the Cold Lake Freeze, Minor Hockey Teams)
Lacrosse (Home to the Cold Lake Heat, Minor Lacrosse Teams)
Volleyball (Assumption and CLHS Royals)
Football (CLHS Royals)
Basketball (Assumption and CLHS Royals)
Soccer (Indoor and outdoor-Cold Lake Minor Soccer)
Baseball
Rugby (Assumption Crusader's and CLHS Royals combined team and Cold Lake Penguins Men's RFC)
Hapkido
Tae Kwon Do (unified taekwondo, and occasionally International Taekwon-Do Federation or World Taekwondo Federation)
Figure Skating (Cold Lake Figure Skating Club)
Figure Skating (Norlight Skating Club)
Downhill Skiing (Kinosoo Ridge Snow Resort)
Dancing (Pirouette School of Dance with award-winning dance team, Fame Dance (Located at the Energy Centre)
Mixed Martial Arts (Team Sparta)
Roller Derby (Lakeland Ladykillers Roller Derby League)
Swimming (Cold Lake Marlins Swim Club)
Powerlifting (Cold Lake Bar Benders)
Gymnastics (Lakeland Gymnastics Club)
Disc Golf
Pickleball
Bowling (Marina Bowling Centre)

Government 
Mayors:
 Craig Copeland, 2007–present
 Allan Buck, 2004–2007
 Hansa Thaleshvar, 1998–2004
 Raymond Coates, 1996–1998

The last local election was held in October 2021. As of 2021, the councillors of Cold Lake are Bob Mattice, Chris Vining, Vicky Lefebvre, Adele Richardson, Ryan Bailey, and Bill Parker.

At the provincial level, the city is in the district of Bonnyville-Cold Lake-St. Paul. Its current representative is David Hanson, from the United Conservative Party.

At the federal level, the city is in the district of Fort McMurray—Cold Lake. Its current representative is Laila Goodridge, from the Conservative Party of Canada.

Education 
Portage College operates a campus at Cold Lake. Program offerings include academic upgrading, accounting, community social works, nursing, power engineering and university studies among others.
 
Lakeland Catholic School District No. 150 and Northern Lights School Division No. 69 operate public schools within Cold Lake. Cold Lake also hosts a Francophone school named École Voyageur that offers French programming for kindergarten through grade 12, as well as the Cold Lake Cadet Summer Training Centre.

Lakeland Catholic School District No. 150
Holy Cross Elementary School (offering kindergarten through grade 6 programming)
École St. Dominic School (offering pre-kindergarten through grade 6 English and French programming)
Assumption Junior/Senior High School (offering grade 7 through grade 12 English and French programming)

Northern Lights School Division No. 69
Cold Lake Elementary School (offering pre-kindergarten through grade 4 programming)
Ecole North Star Elementary School (offering kindergarten through grade 3 English and French programming)
Nelson Heights School (offering grade 5 through grade 8 programming)
Cold Lake Middle School (offering grade 4 through grade 8)
Cold Lake High School (offering grade 9 through grade 12 programming)
Bridges Outreach School (offering grade 8 and grade 9 programming)
Cold Lake Outreach School (offering grade 10 through grade 12 programming)

Recreation 
Cold Lake is situated near many campgrounds due to its proximity to the lake. The M.D. campground has powered sites, shower facilities with flush toilets, and a covered camp picnic area. The Cold Lake Provincial Park has many sites, and is more secluded than the M.D. site (which is surrounded by development). The Provincial campground boasts a wilderness trail system, a beach, boatlaunch and a powered section. Nearby Meadow Lake Provincial Park to the east, across the border in Saskatchewan, has facilities similar to Cold Lake Provincial Park.

Kinosoo Beach is a favorite destination during the hot summer months between June and August.

The Iron Horse Trail, a recreational trail situated on a former railway line (see rail trail) has its easternmost terminus in Cold Lake.

Recreational pastimes include, among others:

Hockey
Box Lacrosse
Geocaching
Martial Arts
Rugby
Soccer
Swimming
Bowling
Curling
Gymnastics
Golf
Horseback Riding
4H (in Cherry Grove)
Rodeo (Cold Lake Ag Society)
Dance
Sailing
Boating
Fishing
Downhill Skiing
Roller Derby

Museums

Air Force Museum 

The Air Force Museum preserves and exhibits the history of CFB Cold Lake and of 42 Radar Squadron. 42 Radar was on this site from 1954 to 1992, so Cold War era technology is mostly on display in their exhibit. An example of this is the General Electric Height Finder Radar on display.

The Museum has much 4 Wing history on display. The current 4 Wing standing squadrons such as 409 Squadron, 410 Squadron, 419 Squadron, 1 Air Maintenance Squadron, Aerospace Engineering Test Establishment and others are displayed in the Museum. There are a few exhibits of purely historic nature, such as displays on 441 and 416, Squadrons which stood down in 2006 to be amalgamated into 409 Squadron.

The Museum also has four aircraft on display outside, including the CF-5 Freedom Fighter, CT-133 Silver Star, the CT-114 Tutor and the CT-134 Musketeer. The newest addition to the air park is a CF-188 Decoy.

Oil and Gas Museum 
This exhibit was designed, researched and constructed by Grand Centre High School students. This museum explains the history of Oil and gas in the Cold Lake area from Paleolithic times to the present.

Heritage Museum 

The Heritage Museum exhibits a time line of life in Cold Lake, both domestic and commercial. The museum also boasts some impressive murals.

Aboriginal Museum 
The Aboriginal Museum displays the history of the Dene, Cree and Metis peoples in time lines, maps, crafts and cultural displays. There are also bears on display.

Notable people 
Alex Auld, NHL goaltender
Garry Howatt, NHL forward
Alex Janvier, artist
Bonnie McFarlane, comedian
Adam Blank, comedian & podcast host

References

External links 

 
1953 establishments in Alberta
Cities in Alberta
Hudson's Bay Company trading posts